Milton Allimadi is a Ugandan-American author, journalist, professor, and a co-founder of Black Star News.

He is known for his critique of racist writing by white authors about Africa and Africans, in his 2003 book The Hearts of Darkness and his 2021 Manufacturing Hate.

Early life and education 
Allimadi was born in Uganda.

He graduated from the Graduate School of Journalism at Columbia and has a bachelor's and a master's degree in economics from Syracuse University.

Career

Journalism 
Allimadi's first journalism job was as an intern at The Journal of Commerce before working at the Wall Street Journal.  He later worked freelance for the New York Times where his piece Inventing Africa pointed out the trend of white reporters fabricating stories about Africa.

In 1997, he became the founding editor of New York-based investigative newspaper Black Star News.

He criticized Ugandan peacekeepers seconded to the United Nations for acting as proxy police force for the United States.

Allimadi wrote about the relief of Black Americans after Donald Trump was defeated in the 2020 United States presidential election.

Activism 
In 2014, Allimadi created a petition to the United States State Department to revoke the visa of Ugandan politician Sam Kutesa.

Academia 
Allimadi has worked as professor of African studies and an adjunct professor of Criminal Justice at the John Jay College of Criminal Justice, both at City University of New York. As of 2022, he worked at the John Jay College and as an adjunct assistant professor at the Graduate School of Journalism at Columbia.

Literature 
His book The Hearts of Darkness critiques the racist stereotypes that white writers perpetuate about Africa and Africans, specifically descriptions of barbarism, physical, moral and intellectual inferiority, denial of the positive contributions that Black people have made to culture, arts, science, and descriptions of Africa as inhospitable and uncivilized.

Selected publications 
 Targeted Rapes to Spread HIV Started in Uganda, 2009, The New York Times
 The Hearts of Darkness - How White Writers Created the Racist Image of Africa, 2002, Black Star Books 
 Manufacturing Hate - How Africa Was Demonized in Western Media, 2021, Kendall Hunt Publishing Company,

References 

Living people
Syracuse University alumni
Columbia University Graduate School of Journalism alumni
The Wall Street Journal people
The New York Times people
21st-century American journalists
21st-century American writers
Ugandan journalists
21st-century Ugandan writers
John Jay College of Criminal Justice faculty
City University of New York faculty
Columbia University Graduate School of Journalism faculty
21st-century American newspaper founders
American anti-racism activists
Ugandan emigrants to the United States
Year of birth missing (living people)